Raju Gari Gadhi 3 is a 2019 Indian Telugu-language horror comedy film directed and produced by Ohmkar under banner of Oak Entertainmments. Ashwin Babu, Avika Gor are in the lead roles and music composed by Shabir. The film is the third instalment in the Raju Garu Gadhi series that was created by Ohmkar. The cinematography was done by Chota K. Naidu and it was released on 18 October 2019.

It is an official remake of Tamil movie Dhilluku Dhuddu 2.

Plot
Ashwin and his maternal uncle are happy-go-lucky men whose drunken antics create a nuisance for their neighbours. The neighbours try out different methods to escape their antics, but in vain. One of the neighbours, who is a doctor by profession, comes across Maya, whom he is in love with. However, when he tries to express his love, he is beaten black and blue by a mysterious ghost. After finding out details about Maya and the ghost, the doctor and other neighbours plot against Ashwin to make him fall in love with Maya and let the ghost take care of him. Injured in a fight, Ashwin, seeking a physiotherapist's help, and him falling in love with Maya was engineered by his neighbours. Things take a twist, and Ashwin is thrashed by the ghost. He finds out that Maya's father Garudaraja Bhattadhri is a powerful magician in Kerala and that he had set the ghost to protect Maya. He sets out to Kerala to convince Maya's father, along with his uncle. They insult Bhattadhri, and he sets out to do a pooja to harm them. To escape that, they ask for Chakra Mahadevi's help. It turns out that both Bhattadhri and Mahadevi are fake and that there is a real ghost protecting Maya. They go to a black magician, where he reveals the flashback about the ghost. In 1857, a British man named George Williams came to India, where he proposed to girls and spoiled their lives.

Due to a transfer, he came to Kerala, where his lustful thoughts fell on Devyani Kutti, but he was unaware that she was the daughter of the king of black magic, Marthanda Varma. Soon, Marthanda Varma learned of George, so to kill George, he took the great Yatchi palm script on a pournami day and gave an order to Yatchi to protect his daughter. That night, George proposes to Devyani and at that moment, Yatchi killed George. After those Britishers went, he stuffed Yatchi into an idol and buried it. After that, Maya's father says that he has a similar Yatchi in his house, so the magician performs pooja to find out whether it is active, so that time it is active. To kill the Yatchi, they need to retrieve the palm script from the bungalow where Maya's father took the Yatchi. Ashwin and others had various encounters with other ghosts there, and then they finally retrieved the palm script and killed the ghost. The end credits show the marriage of Ashwin and Maya.

Cast
 Ashwin Babu as Ashwin
 Avika Gor as Maya
 Urvashi as Rajamatha
 Ali as Ashwin's uncle 
 Brahmaji as Doctor
 Ajay Ghosh as Garudaraja Pillai
 Prabhas Sreenu
 Hari Teja
 K. Sivasankar as Colony president
 Dhanraj
 Getup Srinu
 Sneha Gupta - Item Girl 1 ("Naa Gadhiloki Ra")
 Radhika S Mayadev - Item Girl 2 ("Naa Gadhiloki Ra")

Music 
Music for the film was composed by Shabir, and features the song "Naa Gadhiloki Raa" with lyrics Sri Mani and performed by M. M. Manasi, Sri Vardhini, Thanushree Natarajan, Miraya Varma, LV Revanth and Shabir. The other two songs, "Yeppudeppu" and "Macha Evarikkada", were reused from Dhilluku Dhuddu 2.

Reception 

The Times of India gave 2 out of 5 stars stating "Devoid of goosebump moments, the film makes do with humour".

Great Andhra gave 2 out of 5 stars stating "If you are okay with some low quality humor and silly jokes, “Raju Gari Gadhi 3” can be passable".

IndiaGlitz gave 2.75 out of 5 stars stating "The film is ruined by a wafer-thin storyline.  It actually comes across as an excuse for launching Ashwin Babu as a massy hero.  The narration has loose ends and the comedy lacks punch.  The technical departments are able and pull off a mature job.".

Prequels 
It is sequel to Raju Gari Gadhi 2 released on 13 October 2017, and first installment Raju Gari Gadhi which was released on 16 October 2015.

See also
Highest-grossing Telugu franchises and film series

References

External links 

2019 horror films
2019 films
2010s Telugu-language films
Indian comedy horror films
Indian sequel films
Films scored by Thaman S
Indian horror film remakes
Telugu remakes of Tamil films
Films directed by Ohmkar